David Lamont Paulsen (1936–2020) was a professor emeritus of philosophy at Brigham Young University (BYU).  From 1994 to 1998 he held the Richard L. Evans Chair of Religious Understanding at BYU. He was an active faculty member at BYU from 1972–2011.

Biography
Paulsen was born November 13, 1936, in Ephraim, Utah. His parents were educators, and he followed them in their careers.

He received an associate degree from Snow College in English in 1957, a bachelor's degree from BYU in Political Science in 1961 (in which he was BYU's valedictorian), a JD from the University of Chicago Law School in 1964, and a Ph.D. in philosophy from the University of Michigan in 1975, with emphasis in the philosophy of religion. His doctoral dissertation, entitled The Comparative Coherency of Mormon (Finitistic) and Classical Theism, was said by two philosophers critical of LDS theology to be "by far the most detailed and comprehensive defense of Mormon theism."

He married Audrey Lucille Leer and had six children.

Paulsen died November 30, 2020.

Career
Paulsen joined the philosophy department at BYU around 1972 and specialized in Kierkegaard, William James and the philosophy of religion.  In addition to holding the Richard L. Evans Chair, he has also been an Eliza R. Snow Fellow at BYU.  Many of his students have gone on to be important figures in the academic study of Mormonism, including prominently Blake Ostler.

Paulsen was a member of the Church of Jesus Christ of Latter-day Saints (LDS Church), in which he served as a Bishop and counselor in a stake presidency.

Paulsen gave several lectures related to Mormon Studies, including the 2006 Eugene England Memorial Lecture at Utah Valley University and presentations at conferences of the Foundation for Apologetic Information and Research (FAIR).  He presented on "The Divine Feminine" at the 2009 BYU Women's Research Institute Colloquia.  Paulsen was also the coordinator for the Society of Christian Philosophers inaugural inter-mountain meeting at BYU in 1992.

In 2012 just after his retirement a collection of essays entitled Mormonism at the Crossroads of Philosophy and Theology: Essays in Honor of David L. Paulsen was published, edited by Jacob T. Baker.

Writings
Paulsen edited Mormonism in Dialogue with Contemporary Christian Theologies along with Donald W. Musser. Paulsen contributed articles to The International Journal for the Philosophy of Religion, Analysis, Harvard Theological Review, Faith and Philosophy and Speculative Philosophy.  Paulsen also wrote the foreword to The Mormon Doctrine of Deity: The Roberts-Van Der Donckt Discussion  Paulsen has also written several articles for both the FARMS Review and BYU Studies.  One of these articles, written with Martin Pulido, who studied under Paulsen, entitled "A Mother There: Historical Teachings and Sacred Silence" (BYU Studies Vol. 5, no. 1) has been described as a path-breaking article on femininity in LDS doctrine by Valerie M. Hudson.

Paulsen's work was used in Jeffrey R. Holland's General Conference sermon explaining that the Mormon belief that Jesus and God have physical bodies does not exclude Mormons from being Christians.

Notes

Sources
 
Paulsen's vita
Meridian Magazine listing of speakers at an upcoming FAIR conference
Author bio from FARMS
BYU Studies listing of articles by Paulsen
Mormon Scholars Testify entry on Paulsen

External links
 Faculty page at the BYU Department of Philosophy

1936 births
2020 deaths
American leaders of the Church of Jesus Christ of Latter-day Saints
American philosophers
Brigham Young University alumni
Brigham Young University faculty
Philosophers of religion
Snow College alumni
University of Chicago Law School alumni
University of Michigan alumni
Latter Day Saints from Utah
Latter Day Saints from Illinois
Latter Day Saints from Michigan
Latter Day Saint philosophers
People from Ephraim, Utah